Pomacea dolioides is a South American species of freshwater snail with gills and an operculum, an aquatic gastropod mollusk in the family Ampullariidae, the apple snails.

Distribution
The native distribution of this snail is Brazil.

References

dolioides
Gastropods described in 1856